Elite Gymnasium is a school located in Baku, Azerbaijan.  Its address is 49 Nizami, Baku. It was first built in 1936.

Schools in Baku
Secondary schools in Azerbaijan